Opsieobuthus is an extinct genus of centromachid scorpion. The type species O. pottsvillensis was named from the late Carboniferous of Clay City, Indiana. A second species ?O. tungeri was tentatively assigned to the genus from the Early Permian Chemnitz petrified forest in Germany.

References

External links

Fossil taxa described in 1986
Prehistoric scorpions
Permian arthropods of Europe
Permian arachnids
Paleozoic arachnids